Chen Yongbin (born 21 January 1999) is a Chinese footballer currently playing as a midfielder for Qingdao Red Lions. Besides China, he has played in Australia.

Career statistics

Club

Notes

References

1999 births
Living people
People from Guangyuan
Footballers from Sichuan
Chinese footballers
Chinese expatriate footballers
Association football midfielders
China League Two players
Adelaide United FC players
Chinese expatriate sportspeople in Australia
Expatriate soccer players in Australia